St. Mary's Episcopal Church is a historic Episcopal parish in Burlington, Burlington County, New Jersey, United States. The original church was built in 1703. It was supplemented with a new church on adjacent land in 1854.  On May 31, 1972, the new church was added to the National Register of Historic Places and on June 24, 1986, it was declared a National Historic Landmark. It is within the Burlington Historic District.

Old church
In 1695 settlers acquired land for a cemetery at West Broad and Wood streets. In 1702 the Society for the Propagation of the Gospel in Foreign Parts sent Anglican missionaries from England to New Jersey. One of them, John Talbot, became rector of St. Mary's Church (built in 1703) in 1705. It is the first and oldest Episcopal congregation in New Jersey.

As the congregation grew, parishioners decided to build a new, larger church. They commissioned Richard Upjohn to design it. In 1846, construction began on adjoining land at 145 West Broad Street. It was consecrated in 1854.

New church

New St. Mary's Church was constructed between 1846 and 1854. It is one of the earliest attempts in the United States to "follow a specific English medieval church model for which measured drawings existed." This Gothic Revival-style church was designed by Richard Upjohn, who modeled it after St. John's Church in Shottesbrooke, England. It helped to firmly establish Upjohn as a practitioner of Gothic design. It is a massive brownstone church with a long nave. The crossing is topped by a tall stone spire that has eight bells cast in England in 1865 by Thomas Mears II at the Whitechapel Bell Foundry. It has been designated as a National Historic Landmark.

Fire

In 1976 while renovations were being done to the church a mistake made by one of the workers led to a fire which caused extreme roof and interior damage.
The fire was discovered in the early AM hours of April 15, 1976, Holy Thursday.  Eventually, a general alarm fire was declared bringing hundreds of firemen from Burlington City, Burlington Township, Beverly-Edgewater Park, and Willingboro in New Jersey as well as Bristol across the bridge in Pennsylvania.

Gallery

Notable burials
Joseph Bloomfield (1753–1823), Governor of New Jersey.
Elias Boudinot (1740–1821), President of the Continental Congress from 1782 to 1783.
William Bradford (1755–1795), United States Attorney General
Daniel Coxe, Governor of West Jersey
George Washington Doane (1799–1859), second bishop of the Episcopal Diocese of New Jersey.
Rowland Ellis
Edward Burd Grubb Jr. (1841–1913), American Civil War Brevet Brigadier General.
Franklin D'Olier, founder of the American Legion
James Kinsey (1731–1803), Chief Justice of the New Jersey Supreme Court from 1789 to 1803.
Joseph McIlvaine (1769–1826), represented New Jersey in the United States Senate from 1823 to 1826.
William Milnor (1769–1848), member of the U.S. House of Representatives from Pennsylvania and Mayor of Philadelphia.
William H. Odenheimer, third Bishop of New Jersey
Isabel Paterson (1886–1961), libertarian author.
John H. Pugh (1827–1905), represented New Jersey's 2nd congressional district from 1877 to 1879.
Garret D. Wall (1783–1850), United States Senator from 1835 to 1841.
James Walter Wall (1820–1872), United States Senator and Mayor of Burlington, New Jersey.

See also

 List of National Historic Landmarks in New Jersey
 List of the oldest buildings in New Jersey
 St. Mary's Episcopal Church (disambiguation)
 National Register of Historic Places listings in Burlington County, New Jersey

References

External links

Church website
St. Mary's Churchyard
St. Mary's Churchyard at The Political Graveyard
Saint Marys Episcopal Churchyard at Find A Grave

Churches completed in 1854
Churches completed in 1703
Burlington, New Jersey
National Historic Landmarks in New Jersey
Churches on the National Register of Historic Places in New Jersey
Gothic Revival church buildings in New Jersey
Cemeteries in Burlington County, New Jersey
Anglican cemeteries in the United States
Episcopal church buildings in New Jersey
National Register of Historic Places in Burlington County, New Jersey
18th-century Episcopal church buildings
19th-century Episcopal church buildings